Robert H. Peters (October 6, 1937 – December 14, 2021) was a Canadian men's ice hockey coach. He was the head coach of the Bemidji State University ice hockey team from 1967 to 2001. With 702 wins, he ranks fifth all-time in career wins by a men's college ice hockey coach.

Coaching history
Peters entered the college hockey head coaching ranks in 1964 as bench boss at the University of North Dakota. During his initial campaign, Peters, the eventual Western Collegiate Hockey Association Coach of the Year, led the Fighting Sioux to a WCHA title and a third-place finish at the NCAA Championships. He coached in Grand Forks for two seasons, leading the Sioux to a 42–20–1 mark before making a career decision that would change the face of collegiate hockey.

Peters left the Division I powerhouse in 1966 and took over at Bemidji State University. Within two seasons Peters led BSU to its first national championship and set the foundation for what would become one of the most dominant programs in college hockey.

Thirty-five years later, Peters retired from coaching with one of the most impressive lists of achievements in the history of collegiate sports: 744 victories as a head coach, 702 coming at Bemidji State alone, to make Peters the first coach to win 700 or more games at a single school; 13 small-college national championships; and still-standing national collegiate records for most wins in an unbeaten season (31–0–0 in 1983–'84) and longest unbeaten streak (43 games from Nov. 8, 1983 to Jan. 1, 1985).

Peters, the only coach to lead a team to a national championship game in three divisions of college hockey and the only coach to reach the Final Four in all four divisions (Division I, II, III and NAIA), developed five NHL players and numerous Olympians and All-Americans.

A 1960 graduate of the University of North Dakota, Peters spent his collegiate days at goaltender for the Fighting Sioux. He coached at the high school level for one season before rejoining the UND staff as an assistant coach.

CHA commissioner
Retired from coaching, Peters remained heavily involved in the sport of college hockey. In 2001 he became the commissioner of the College Hockey America (CHA) conference.

In addition to appointing Peters CHA Commissioner, the athletic directors of the league's member institutions approved the recommendation by the coaches to name the regular-season championship trophy in honor of Peters as the R.H. "Bob" Peters Cup.

Contributions to college hockey
Peters' influence on college hockey also has stretched outside the arena. He has proven his administrative skills at Bemidji State by serving as athletic director and head hockey coach, and he lent service to several committees. Under Peters' guidance, BSU hockey progressed from NAIA to NCAA Division III to NCAA Division II, and in 1999, BSU elevated its hockey program to Division I. He served on championship committees for the NAIA and NCAA for over 20 years, and in 2001 was named a Hobey Baker Legend of Hockey.

Personal life
Peters died in Bemidji, Minnesota on December 14, 2021, at the age of 84.

Career statistics

Head coaching record

See also
 List of college men's ice hockey coaches with 400 wins

External links

1937 births
2021 deaths
Ice hockey coaches
Canadian ice hockey coaches
North Dakota Fighting Hawks men's ice hockey players
North Dakota Fighting Hawks men's ice hockey coaches
Bemidji State Beavers men's ice hockey coaches
Ice hockey people from Ontario
People from Fort Frances